John Ring may refer to:
 John Ring (American physician), president of the American Medical Association
 John Ring (surgeon), English surgeon, vaccination activist, and man of letters
 John F. Ring, American lawyer and chairman of the National Labor Relations Board
 Johnny Ring, Welsh rugby union and rugby league player